Otoko is a small settlement west of Te Karaka in the Gisborne District of New Zealand's North Island. State Highway 2 runs through Otoko on its way from Ōpōtiki to Gisborne.

History

Artist Peter Williams farmed in the area in the 1960s.

The community was affected by flooding and frosts in August 2016. It also briefly relied on a generator for power after a plane crash in December 2016.

A man's body was found in Otoko in July 2019.

Local roads were upgraded in 2020 with funding from the Provincial Growth Fund.

Parks

Otoko Walkway is a conservation reserve and walkway, owned and operated by the Department of Conservation.

References

Populated places in the Gisborne District